Sleet Cone is a cinder cone in northern British Columbia, Canada. It lies in the Desolation Lava Field and is thought to have last erupted in the Holocene period and is part of the Mount Edziza volcanic complex.

See also
List of volcanoes in Canada
List of Northern Cordilleran volcanoes
Volcanology of Canada
Volcanology of Western Canada

References

Cinder cones of British Columbia
Holocene volcanoes
Monogenetic volcanoes
Mount Edziza volcanic complex
One-thousanders of British Columbia